The cavernous nerves are post-ganglionic parasympathetic nerves that facilitate penile erection and clitoral erection.  They arise from cell bodies in the inferior hypogastric plexus where they receive the pre-ganglionic pelvic splanchnic nerves (S2-S4).

In the penis, there are both lesser cavernous nerves and a greater cavernous nerve.

Clinical considerations 
These nerves are susceptible to injury following prostatectomy or genital surgery.

Nerve-Sparing prostatectomy was invented for surgeons to avoid injuring the nerves and causing erectile dysfunction complications. During surgery, a doctor may apply a small electrical stimulation to the nerve and measure the erectile function with a penile plethysmograph.  This test aids the surgeon in identifying the nerves, which are difficult to see.

References

External links
 Gray's Anatomy, 1918 edition

Parasympathetic nervous system
Human penis anatomy